Mizo literature is the literature written in Mizo ṭawng, the principal language of the Mizo peoples, which has both written and oral traditions. It has undergone a considerable change in the 20th century. The language developed mainly from the Lushai language, with significant influence from Pawi language, Paite language and Hmar language, especially at the literary level. All Mizo languages such as Pawi language, Paite language etc. remained unwritten until the beginning of the twentieth century. However, there was unwritten secular literature in the form of folktales, war chants etc.  passed down from one generation to another. And there was rich religious literature in the form of sacerdotal chants. These are the chants used by the two types of priests, namely Bawlpu and Sadâwt. This article is about the written literature.

Pre-Christianisation period
This period of Mizo (written) literature usually refers to the period between 1860 and 1894. Although the Mizo alphabet proper was created around May 1894, written Mizo literature can be said to start from the publication of Progressive Colloquial Exercises in the Lushai Dialect by Thangliana (which is the Mizo name of Thomas Herbert Lewin) in 1874. In this book he wrote down two Mizo folktales Chemtatrawta and Lalruanga leh Kungawrhi with their English translations, and included some Mizo words with their English meaning. Along with Sir George Campbell, G.H. Damant, R.G. Woodthorpe etc., other employees of the British East India Company, Thangliana also studied Mizo culture and language, producing important works.

Early period
This is the period between 1894 and 1920, when most of the literary work was produced by the missionaries. Mizo alphabet was created in 1894, and schools were established soon after the creation of Mizo alphabet. On 22 October 1896 the first Mizo language book was published under the title Mizo Zir Tir Bu (lit. Mizo primer). This was a book on Christian religion and morality based on Christianity.

The two Christian missionaries J.H. Lorrain (Pu Buanga) and F.W. Savidge (Sap Upa) started translating the book of gospel according to Luke on 21 August 1895. They went on to translate the gospel according to John, and the two books were printed and published in 1898. Other books were also translated soon after. Some of the most well-known books published during this period were:
 Isua chanchin (1905)
 Isua hnenah lo kal rawh (1905-6)
 Thu inchhang (1908)
 The Lushai Grammar and Dictionary (1898, by J.H. Lorrain)
 Dictionary of Lushai (J.H. Lorrain)
A number of devotional songs were translated by other missionaries who replaced J.H. Lorrain and F.W. Savidge, such as Edwin Rowlands etc.

Middle period
The middle period of Mizo literature (1920–1970) saw the rise of prominent writers such as Liangkhaia, who published hundreds of articles in the monthly Kristian Tlangau and authored Mizo chanchin (in two volumes) which contained, besides a coherent treatment of Mizo history, a number of ancient chants and festive songs which he collected from various sources. Besides this, he and his close friends collected various other ancient Mizo poems, publishing it under a single volume Zoram kan lo luh hma Pawi rama kan la awm lai leh Zoram luh tirh vela chhuak ṭante. It contains various Chai hla, Hlado, Zai and a number of Hla. This collection is one of the most reliable sources of knowledge for ancient Mizo poetry

Authors during this period are usually referred to as Hranghluite in Mizo culture.

Poetry

Awithangpa
One of the best known Mizo language poets, Awithangpa (1885–1965) (whose real name is Hmarlûtvunga) was active during this period. The beautiful, innovative expressions he used in his poems are now generally thought by most to be part of Mizo poetic language since time immemorial, although he was the first to use them and were in fact mostly his own coinage. Examples include expressions such as ram loh, chohar di etc. The great reputation of his zai (poems) among Mizo people can be judged from the fact that, although his poems were not initially recorded in writing, when Mizo littérateurs later tried to collect and record his poems, people still remembered most of his poems and could still recite them in full.

Other poets
Various other poets were active during this period of Mizo literature. Some of them were religious poets, writing mainly songs used in various Christian services in the Mizo tradition, which include Pathianni inkhâwm (Sunday service), lènkhâwm (a get-together for singing), khawhạr (condolence service) etc. Although they do not form part of Mizo secular literature, the richness and beauty of Mizo language is manifest in the elegies, worship songs etc. they composed, and their poems have therefore been consistently included in school and university curriculum. Poets of this tradition include Patea (1894–1950) (who composed 55 songs) and Saihnuna (1894–1949)(who composed about 98 songs) and the blind poet Laithangpuia (1885–1935) (who composed about 27 songs) among others.

On the other hand, there were other poets who wrote both religious and secular poems, such as R.L. Kamlala (1902–1980), Damhauhva (1909–1972) etc.

The poet Pu Rokunga is one of the most prolific Mizo poets, composing patriotic songs, festive songs, Christmas songs, idylls, poems about nature etc. He was chosen Poet of the Century by the Mizo Millennium Celebration Committee in 2000.

Other best known poets include

 Capt. L.Z. Sailo
 Lalṭanpuia
 Lalzova Chhangte (usually referred to as Fam Lalzova)
 P. S. Chawngthu
 Vankhama
 V. Thangzama
 Zirsangzela Hnamte
 Pastor Saikhuma
etc.

Play
Mizo language dramatists active during this period include

Prose
Well-known writers during this period include Nuchhungi Renthlei (1914–2002), and Lalthangfala Sailo, who got Padma Shri award in Literature in 1986 and 2009 respectively. L. Biakliana (1918–1941), who wrote the first Mizo novel Hawilopari, Kaphleia (1910–1940), C. Ṭhuamluaia (1922–1959), K.C. Lalvunga, J. F. Laldailova, Siamkima Khawlhring etc.

Modern period
This period of Mizo literature starts in 1970 and continues to the present. The Mizo Academy of Letters started awarding its Book of the Year in 1989. The academy also awards lifetime achievement in Mizo literature. Some of the most prominent writers during this period are James Dokhuma (1932–2008), Khawlkungi (1927-2015), B. Lalthangliana (1945- ), Siamkima Khawlhring (1938–1992), Ralte L. Thanmawia (1954- ), C. Laizawna (1959- ), Laltluangliana Khiangte (1961- ), Lalzuahliana (1962- ), Vanneihtluanga (1959- ), Mafaa Hauhnar(1975-2018)  Lalzuia Colney (Padma Shri awardee) etc.

The list of books awarded so far and their authors are tabulated below:

See also
Mizo Hlakungpui Mual

References

Others
Khiangte, Laltluangliana, Mizo lehkhabu zempui (A compendium of Mizo bibliography), published by Mizo department of Mizoram University, 2005.
Khiangte, Laltluangliana, Lehkhabu Ramtiam, L.T.L. Publications, Aizawl, 1993.
Mizo Academy of Letters, Zo kalsiam, Aizawl, 1997.
Vanlawma, R., Awithangpa, Aizawl, 1989.
Lalthangliana, B. (Editor), Mizo hla leh a phuahtute, Hrangbana College, Aizawl. First edition 1999.

Further reading
 Khiangte, Laltluangliana, Mizo drama: origin, development, and themes. Cosmo Publications, 1993.
 Zoramdinthara, Dr., Mizo Fiction: Emergence and Development. Ruby Press & Co. 2013. 

Culture of Mizoram
Indian literature by language
Mizo language